Markus F. Peschl (born 1965) is an Austrian cognitive scientist, philosopher of mind, philosopher of science and researcher on innovation, and professor for Cognitive Science and Philosophy of Science at the University of Vienna, Austria. He is known for his early work on cognitive modelling, and his more recent work concerning a"socio-epistemological approach to innovation."

Life and work 
Peschl obtained his MA in Computer Science (studies in Cognitive Science & Psychology) at the Vienna University of Technology in 1983, and in 1989 his PhD in computer science and cognitive science at the Vienna University of Technology.

Peschl started his academic career at the University of California, San Diego (UCSD, cognitive science, neuroscience, and philosophy department), at the University of Sussex and in France for post-doctoral research. Peschl is professor for Cognitive Science and Philosophy of Science at the University of Vienna, Austria.

His focus of research is on the highly interdisciplinary question of knowledge (creation/innovation, construction) in various contexts: in natural and artificial cognitive systems, in science, in organizations, in educational settings, and in the context of knowledge technologies and their embedding in social systems. He is working in the field of radical innovation, where he developed the concepts of "emergent innovation" and "enabling spaces."

Selected publications
 Peschl, Markus F. Cognitive modelling. Ein Beitrag zur cognitive science aus der Perspektive des Konstruktivismus und des Konnektionismus, Wiesbaden  Dt. Universitätsverlag, 1990.
 Peschl, Markus F. Formen des Konstruktivismus in Diskussion. Materialien zu den "acht Vorlesungen über den konstruktiven Realismus", Wien 1991, WUV-Verlag.
 Peschl, Markus F. Repräsentation und Konstruktion. Kognitions- und neuroinformatische Konzepte als Grundlage einer naturalisierten Epistemologie und Wissenschaftstheorie, Braunschweig/Wiesbaden 1994. 
 Peschl, Markus F., and Alexander Riegler. Does representation need reality?. Springer US, 1999.
 
 Peschl, Markus F., and Thomas Fundneider. "Emergent Innovation and Sustainable Knowledge Co-creation A Socio-epistemological Approach to "Innovation from within"." The Open Knowledge Society. A Computer Science and Information Systems Manifesto. Springer Berlin Heidelberg, 2008. 101-108.

References

External links 
 Markus F. Peschl's webpage at University of Vienna
 Markus F. Peschl's Google Scholar profile 

1965 births
Living people
Austrian philosophers
Academic staff of the University of Vienna